Eugerres plumieri, the striped mojarra, is a demersal fish found in the western Atlantic, from North Carolina south along the U.S. coast, in the Gulf of Mexico, in the Caribbean from Cuba to Puerto Rico, and along the Central and South American coast from Mexico to Colombia. It inhabits shallow coastal waters with low salinity in mangrove-lined creeks and lagoons. It feeds on aquatic insects, crustaceans, micro-bivalves and detritus. This species has high fecundity, producing 85,345 to 953,870 eggs, and reaches a length of 40 cm. It is abundant in Mexico and Colombia, where it is one of the most important fishing resources, both as food and fishing bait.

References

Gerreidae
Fish described in 1830
Taxa named by Georges Cuvier